Charles Whitaker (c. 1642–1715) was twice  M.P. for Ipswich, firstly between October 1695 and November 1696, and later between 1701 and 1702.  He sat as a Whig

References

1642 births
1715 deaths
Members of the Parliament of England (pre-1707) for Ipswich
English MPs 1695–1698
English MPs 1701–1702
Whig (British political party) MPs for English constituencies